The Gryphaeidae, common name the foam oysters or honeycomb oysters, are a family of marine bivalve mollusks. This family of bivalves is very well represented in the fossil record, however the number of living species is very few.

All species have shells cemented to a substrate.  Shells are considered brittle, inequivalve, with the left, lower (cemented) valve convex and the right (upper, non-cemented) valve flat or slightly concave.

Subfamilies
Genera and species within this family are divided into three subfamilies, Exogyrinae, Gryphaeinae and Pycnodonteinae. Both Exogyrinae and Gryphaeinae are completely extinct. Only two genera Hyotissa and Neopycnodonte in the subfamily Pycnodonteinae have extant species.

Genera and species
Genera and species within the family Gryphaeidae include:
Family Gryphaeidae Vialov, 1936 (some genera also known as Devil's toenails)
Subfamily †Exogyrinae Vialov, 1936
Genus †Aetostreon Bayle, 1878
Genus †Amphidonte Fischer von Waldheim, 1829
Genus †Costagyra Vialov, 1936
Genus †Exogyra Say, 1820
Genus †Fluctogyra Vialov, 1936
Genus †Gryphaeostrea Conrad, 1865
Genus †Gyrostrea Mirkamalov, 1963
Genus †Ilymatogyra  Stenzel, 1971 
Genus †Nanogyra Beurlen, 1958
Genus †Nutogyra Vialov, 1936
Genus †Planospirites Lamarck, 1801
Genus †Vultogryphaea Vialov, 1936
Subfamily †Gryphaeinae Vialov, 1936
Genus †Africogryphaea Freneix, 1963
Genus †Deltoideum Rollier, 1917
Genus †Gryphaea Lamarck, 1801
Genus †Liostrea DouvillŽ, 1904
Genus †Pernostrea Munier-Chalmas, 1864
Genus †Praeexogyra Charles, 1952
Subfamily Pycnodonteinae Stenzel, 1959
Genus †Gigantostrea (Sacco, 1897)
Genus Hyotissa Stenzel, 1971
Genus †Labrostrea Vialov, 1936
Genus Neopycnodonte Stenzel, 1971
Genus †Pycnodonte (Fischer von Waldheim, 1835)
Genus †Texigryphaea Stenzel, 1959
Subfamily Incertae sedis
 Genus †Rhynchostreon Bayle, 1878

References

 
Extant Early Triassic first appearances
Bivalve families